The Berystede is a hotel in South Ascot, Berkshire, England.

History 
The Berystede site was originally part of the parish of Sunninghill, an area of great antiquity. There are a number of Bronze Age barrows in the district, and the course of the great Roman road, the Devil's Highway crosses the Bagshot-Sunninghill road near Little Stream. Sunninghill was first called a manor in 1362 when it was settled by John de Sunninghill and his wife, Joan. It was subsequently sold many times, being held, among others, by Elizabeth Woodville wife of Edward IV and the Abbots of Chertsey.

By the end of the 18th century, the original manor had been divided to provide land for the large houses which were clustering around fashionable Windsor. In the 19th century the Berystede site, shown only as rough pasture-land on contemporary maps, belonged to the Murray family, Lords Elibank, whose fine Victorian house, 'Elibank', was demolished in the 1950s. The name Elibank survives with a bungalow built on the site in the 1950s which was replaced by three modern houses in the 1990s.

At the end of the 19th century Sunninghill parish, having become unwieldy during the period of Victorian expansion, was divided and the Berystede celebrated its metamorphosis into a hotel in the newly created parish of South Ascot.

The Standish family and the original Berystede 

In 1870 the 23-year-old Henry Noailles Widdrington Standish married Helene de Perusse, daughter of the French Comte Des Cars. The couple had estates in both England and France, but their close friendship with the Prince and Princess of Wales (later King Edward VII and Queen Alexandra) made a country house within easy reach of London and Windsor essential.

The choice of site was probably influenced by their friendship with the Barnetts who were already in residence at Kings Beeches on the eastern side of Bagshot Road.

The original building would have looked like the core of the present hotel, its Gothic Tudor mix of styles the height of Victorian fashion. The turrets, then both conical, were a reminder of the couple's French connections, for not only was Helene from Rambouillet, but also Henry's family hailed from France his maternal grandfather being the Duke de Poix. The choice of the name 'Bery Stede' (then two words) was appropriate as the land had been shown as pastureland on maps throughout the century. The old English word bere indicates corn or pasture land and stede means the site of a dwelling.

The residence was well staffed with butler, valet, cook, housekeeper, maidservants, a lady's maid and a night watchman. A small army of gardeners tended the newly landscaped grounds and Berystede Lodge, still standing at the Brockenhurst Road entrance, has until recently, always been the home of the head gardener. The stables, now the Garage, housed grooms, footmen, coachmen, horses and carriages emblazoned with the Standish crest of an owl, with a rat in its talons proper.

The Fire 

The original house was destroyed by fire in the early hours of 27 October 1886. Local newspaper reports give a graphic account of the conflagration, the injury to members of the family and staff and of the tragic death of Eliza Kleininger, Mrs. Standish's lady's maid.

There was little that could have been done to save the house, despite the efforts of the Barnett family and other neighbours. Running water was a scarce commodity in the Victorian household and the nearest fire services were miles away at Windsor, Egham, and Staines, and both messenger and appliance were horse-drawn.

By the morning only the walls of the house remained and the Prince of Wales himself came over from Windsor to inspect the ruins and comfort the family, then being cared for at Kings Beeches.

Rebuilding and conversion into a hotel 

After the fire, the land reverted to the Elibanks and remained derelict for some years, but towards the end of the century the ruins were rebuilt and the Berystede was converted into a hotel.

The management of the hotel during this Edwardian period was in the hands of Miss Halford and Miss Hancock. In 1913 Horace Myers took over the management and was to remain in charge until 1930. During the First World War, he kept the home fires burning quite literally by filling the garages with coal.

Nineteen twenties and thirties 

The ownership of the hotel changed in 1920 when it was bought by the Chaplain family. It was an elegant period with the highlight of the year being the Royal Ascot Meeting 4 June. The June meeting was the only one held at the Ascot course, but it was always a splendid occasion – even in 1936 when court mourning after the death of George V threatened to dampen spirits.

The fashionable ladies made it the famous-Black and White Ascot' and how striking they must have looked against the green background of the turf. During Race Week the great families came to their Ascot homes and the local newspapers ran a 'Court Circular' on the house parties and guests, the Berystede featuring alongside all the great houses of the district.

The hotel suffered another disastrous fire in the early 1930s, but after a period of refurbishment, the Berystede emerged slightly larger and modernised to a considerable extent. An entry in Kelly's Directory for 1931 states that the hotel was 'now rebuilt and re-equipped to meet the high standards of modem luxury; two hard and two grass tennis courts,  of woodland and heated lock-up garages'.

Second World War 

During the Second World War the Berystede was requisitioned for war service. When the Courts of Justice became a casualty of the bombing they found a temporary home at the hotel. 180 cases were dealt with during this period and prisoners were brought down daily from London to stand trial before Mr. Norman Birkett.

Woolwich Arsenal also moved from its vulnerable London home and came to Ascot Racecourse. The men of the Royal Artillery and Royal Horse Artillery were billeted locally whilst the officers found a very cosy billet at the Berystede. For the last two and a half years of the war 30 officers of the 8th and 9th United States Air Force, the First Allied Airborne Army and the IX Troop Carrier Command were accommodated in rooms 20–35 as they were stationed at nearby Silwood Park.

Late 20th and early 21st centuries 

In 1961, Trust House Hotels Training Centre was begun and enlarged in 1965, when an extension of 28 bedrooms was added. The aim was to give personnel throughout the group instruction in all aspects of hotel operations, and since 1971, when Trust Houses merged with Forte Holdings this training scheme had become a feature of each individual hotel. A restaurant was also added over the existing ballroom and an outdoor swimming pool (now gone) was built.

In May 1970 a Conference Wing, comprising two main conference rooms, four small meeting rooms, a lounge area and bar were constructed. This wing gave the hotel an extra 32 bedrooms and now houses the present day conference centre.

As a Macdonald hotel

In 2001 the Forte Heritage Berystede Hotel became a member of the Macdonald Hotels Group.
In 2006 The Macdonald Berystede Hotel underwent a £10 million redevelopment. This included the addition of a new health and beauty spa, 39 new 'Club Class' bedrooms and refurbishment of all the bedrooms and public areas.

The Hyperion Restaurant also received a refurbishment and the addition of its roof terrace. The centrepiece of the re-development at the hotel was the addition of a 500 capacity conference and function suite.

The Berystede was one of 27 properties which were going to be sold by the Macdonald Hotels Group in 2019 to a private equity and real estate investor without previous hotel interests, to clear Macdonald's bank debt of nearly £190 million. The proposed buyer was understood to be Centerbridge Partners, a New York-based private equity and real estate business with an office in London that manages more than $28 billion of assets. Centerbridge was believed to be working with Hamilton Hotel Partners, an independent hotel advisory company.

The Berystede and Royal Ascot 

From its beginning in the 1870s, the Berystede has always been involved in the Royal Ascot Meeting. The Standishes not only joined the Royal Family’s party at the races, but also held their own Ascot Week Celebrations.

As a hotel, the Berystede has prided itself on recreating this house-party atmosphere for its Ascot Week guests, and named two rooms after racing events: the Hyperion Restaurant takes its name from the famous Derby winner who sired more champions than any horse before him. When he died in 1960, he had sired the winners of 748 races. The bar is named after the Diadem Stakes, a six-furlong sprint first held at Ascot in October 1946, the first year, incidentally, in which a meeting other than the Royal Meeting had been held.

In such an atmosphere many a race has been discussed, losers, consoled and winners toasted. But those who gather in the Diadem Bar before the races would do well to heed the words of 'Patroclus', racing correspondent of the Sporting Magazine which ring as true today as they did when they were first written in 1827: 'I have seen flowers grow in stony places, / Kindness done by men with ugly faces / And the Gold Cup won by the worst horse at the races.'

See also 
 Standish family
 Standish, Greater Manchester

References

Sources 
"Some Ramblings of an old Bogonian, Stories in and Around South Ascot" Percy Hathaway (1995)

External links 
  Macdonald Berystede Hotel & Spa official site

Country houses in Berkshire
Buildings and structures in the Royal Borough of Windsor and Maidenhead
Hotels in Berkshire
Country house hotels